Kfar Dunin is a village in Lebanon, 102 km from the capital Beirut and 580 m from sea coast remote. Adjacent villages: Deir Kifa, Alkaline, Khirbat Silm, Der Ntar. It is considered first of villages in Bent Jbeil district of Nabatieh Governorate. Its population is 6000 people.

History
In 1875 Victor Guérin noted: "Near a little mosque are well-cut stones, the remains of a demolished church, of which
there also survive fragments of monolithic columns and several broken capitals, strewing the soil in several places, and especially near the Sheikh's house.' He estimated that the village had 350 to 400 Metawileh inhabitants.

In 1881, the PEF's Survey of Western Palestine (SWP) described it as: "A village, built of stone, containing about 150 Metawileh, on a hill, surrounded by figs, olives, and arable land. The water is obtained from a spring near and cisterns in the village."

At the beginning of March 1986 a Ghanaian soldier serving with UNIFIL was shot and injured by an Israeli soldier in Kafr Dunin. The Israelis had launched a search operation, the largest since their withdrawal to their security zone in June 1985, looking for two of their soldiers who had been captured. Two Israelis were killed in the operation.

References

Bibliography

 (p. 96)

External links
Survey of Western Palestine, Map 2:  IAA, Wikimedia commons
Kfar Dounine, Localiban 

Populated places in the Israeli security zone 1985–2000
Populated places in Bint Jbeil District
Shia Muslim communities in Lebanon